Tethya actinia is a sea sponge belonging to the family Tethyidae.

While it is highly toxic to fish, it is known to be preyed upon by the hawksbill turtle, Eretmochelys imbricata.

References

Hadromerida
Animals described in 1950